Denton County is located in the U.S. state of Texas. As of the 2020 census, its population was 906,422, making it the 7th-most populous county in Texas. The county seat is Denton.  The county, which was named for John B. Denton, was established in 1846. Denton County constitutes part of the Dallas–Fort Worth metroplex. In 2007, it was one of the fastest-growing counties in the United States.

History

Before the arrival of settlers, various Native American peoples, including the Kichai and the Lenape, infrequently populated the area.  The area was settled by Peters Colony landowners in the early 1840s.  Until the annexation of Texas, the area was considered part of Fannin County.  On April 11, 1846, the First Texas Legislature established Denton County.  The county was named for John B. Denton, who was killed while raiding a Native American village in Tarrant County in 1841.  Originally, the county seat was set at Pickneyville.  This was later changed to Alton, where the Old Alton Bridge currently stands, and then moved finally to Denton.

By 1860, the population of the county had increased to 5,031.  On March 4, 1861, residents of the county narrowly voted for secession from the Union, with 331 votes cast for and 264 against.  The Missouri–Kansas–Texas Railroad reached Lewisville, located in the southern portion of the county, by the early 1880s.  The Denton County Courthouse-on-the-Square was built in 1896, and currently houses various government offices, as well as a museum.

Geography

Denton County is located in the northern part of the Dallas–Fort Worth metroplex, about 35 miles south of the border between Texas and Oklahoma. It is drained by two forks of the Trinity River. The largest body of water in Denton County is Lewisville Lake, which was formed in 1954 when the Garza–Little Elm Reservoir was merged with Lake Dallas. The county is on the western edge of the eastern Cross Timbers and also encompasses parts of the Grand Prairie portion of the Texas blackland prairies. Portions of Denton County sit atop the Barnett shale, a geological formation believed to contain large quantities of natural shale gas. Between 1995 and 2007, the number of natural gas wells in the county increased from 156 to 1,820, which has led to some controversy over the pollution associated with hydraulic fracturing.

Lakes 
 Lewisville Lake
 Lake Ray Roberts

Adjacent counties
 Cooke County (north)
 Grayson County (northeast)
 Collin County (east)
 Dallas County (southeast)
 Tarrant County (south)
 Wise County (west)

Communities

Cities

Multiple counties
 Carrollton (partly in Dallas County and a small part in Collin County)
 Celina (mostly in Collin County)
 Coppell (mostly in Dallas County)
 Dallas (mostly in Dallas County with small parts in Collin, Kaufman, Rockwall and Denton counties)
 Fort Worth (mostly in Tarrant County with small parts in Johnson, Parker, Wise, and Denton counties)
 Frisco (mostly in Collin County)
 Grapevine (mostly in Tarrant County and a small part in Dallas County)
 Haslet (mostly in Tarrant County)
 Lewisville (small part in Dallas County)
 Plano (mostly in Collin County)
 Southlake (mostly in Tarrant County)

Denton County only

 Aubrey
 Corinth
 Denton (county seat)
 Highland Village
 Justin
 Krugerville
 Krum
 Lake Dallas
 Lakewood Village
 Little Elm
 Oak Point
 Pilot Point
 Roanoke
 Sanger
 The Colony

Towns

Multiple counties
 Flower Mound (small part in Tarrant County)
 Hebron (small part in Collin County)
 Prosper (mostly in Collin County)
 Trophy Club (small part in Tarrant County)
 Westlake (mostly in Tarrant County)

Denton County only

 Argyle
 Bartonville
 Copper Canyon
 Cross Roads
 DISH
 Double Oak
 Draper
 Hackberry
 Hickory Creek
 Lincoln Park
 Northlake
 Ponder
 Providence Village
 Shady Shores

Census-designated places
 Lantana
 Paloma Creek
 Paloma Creek South
 Savannah

Unincorporated communities
 Alliance (partly in Tarrant County)
 Bolivar
 Navo

Ghost town
 Elizabethtown

Demographics

Note: the US Census treats Hispanic/Latino as an ethnic category. This table excludes Latinos from the racial categories and assigns them to a separate category. Hispanics/Latinos can be of any race.

According to the 2010 United States census, there were 662,614 people, 224,840 households and 256,139 housing units in the county. The population density was 754.3 people per square mile. By the 2020 census, its population increased to 906,422, representing continued population growth among suburban communities outside of the principal metropolitan cities of Dallas and Fort Worth. Denton County ranked 29th on the U.S. Census Bureau's list of fastest-growing counties between 2000 and 2007, with a 41.4% increase in population.

In 2010, the racial makeup of the county was 75% White, 8.4% African American, 0.7% Native American, 6.6% Asian,  and 3.0% from two or more races. About 18.2% of the population was Hispanic or Latino of any race. The 2020 census determined the racial and ethnic makeup was 53.58% non-Hispanic white, 10.52% Black or African American, 0.40% Native American, 10.23% Asian, 0.07% Pacific Islander, 0.43% some other race, 4.60% multiracial, and 20.16% Hispanic or Latino American of any race, reflecting state and nationwide demographic trends of greater diversification.

A Williams Institute analysis of 2010 census data found about 5.2 same-sex couples per 1,000 households in the county.

Government and politics

Government 
Denton County, like all counties in Texas, is governed by a commissioners court, which consists of the county judge (the chairperson of the court), who is elected county-wide, and four commissioners who are elected by the voters in each of four districts.

Justices of the peace are county officials with jurisdiction over landlord/tenant issues, small civil claims, certain misdemeanors, and other matters.

County Judge & Commissioners

County Officials

Justices of the Peace

Law enforcement
The Denton Sheriff's Office employs more than 600 people, for the Denton County Sheriff's Office, most in the Detention Bureau. The office operates a county jail that houses up to 1,400 prisoners. The office is co-located with the jail at 127 North Woodrow Lane in the county seat of Denton.

 the current sheriff is Tracy Murphree, who was first elected in 2016. That election was particularly contentious, with previous sheriff William B. Travis dogged by scandal, and new candidate Murphree making headlines for threatening violence against transgender people.

Politics
Denton County, like most suburban counties in Texas, is reliably Republican in statewide and national elections, although becoming less so since the 2018 election, when Beto O'Rourke earned 45.52% of the county's votes and two Democrats were elected. The last Democratic presidential candidate to win the county was native Texan Lyndon B. Johnson in 1964, the only time since 1952 that the county has been carried by a Democrat. Denton swung rapidly into the Republican column at the federal level in the 1950s and 1960s as Dallas and Fort Worth's suburbs spilled into the county.

In 2018, former State Representative Michelle Beckley became the first Democrat elected to the state legislature from Denton County since 1984. Her district at the time, the former 65th, was located entirely within Denton County, and included significant portions of Carrollton, Highland Village and Lewisville. Also in 2018, Christopher Lopez was elected to Justice of the Peace, Precinct 6, and became the first Democrat elected at the county level since 2004. 

Despite a Republican advantage, Denton continues to trend leftward, as Joe Biden managed 45.2% (to Donald Trump's 53.3%) in the 2020 presidential election, the best result for a Democrat since 1976. Many other suburban Texas counties, including its immediate neighbors in Collin County and Tarrant County as well as those around Houston and Austin, showed similar swings since 2016.

United States Representatives

Texas State Representatives

Texas State Senators

State Board of Education Members

Education

K-12 schools
These school districts lie entirely within Denton County:
 Argyle Independent School District
 Aubrey Independent School District
 Denton Independent School District
 Lake Dallas Independent School District
 Lewisville Independent School District
 Little Elm Independent School District
 Ponder Independent School District
 Sanger Independent School District

These school districts lie partly within Denton County:
 Carrollton-Farmers Branch Independent School District
 Celina Independent School District
 Era Independent School District
 Frisco Independent School District
 Krum Independent School District
 Northwest Independent School District
 Pilot Point Independent School District
 Prosper Independent School District
 Slidell Independent School District

These private educational institutions serve Denton County:
 Denton Calvary Academy
 Coram Deo Academy
 Lakeland Christian Academy
 Liberty Christian School
 Selwyn College Preparatory School

From around 1997 to 2015, the number of non-Hispanic white children in K-12 schools in the county increased by 20,000 as part of a trend of white flight and suburbanization by non-Hispanic white families.

Colleges and universities
According to the Texas Education Code, most of Denton County is assigned to North Central Texas College for community college. However portions within Celina ISD, Proper ISD, and the municipalities of Frisco and The Colony are instead assigned to Collin College (formerly Collin County Community College), and portions zoned to Carrollton-Farmers Branch ISD are assigned to Dallas College (formerly Dallas County Community College District).

These four year higher-education institutions serve Denton County:
 University of North Texas (UNT)
 Texas Woman's University

Transportation
The Denton County Transportation Authority (DCTA) operates fixed-route bus services, on-demand GoZone service, and ACCESS paratransit service in the county that includes Denton, Lewisville, and Highland Village. SPAN Transit covers areas outside of Denton and Lewisville.

DCTA also operates the A-train, a commuter rail service that runs from Denton to Carrollton, at which station passengers can switch to the Green Line train owned and operated by Dallas Area Rapid Transit (DART). Passengers can transfer to other DART lines (denominated by different colors) at the downtown Dallas DART station.

The county is home to the Denton Municipal Airport and the Northwest Regional Airport in Roanoke. Dallas/Fort Worth International Airport is located a few miles south of the county.

Major highways

Notable people
 Dick Armey, former U.S. House Majority Leader and a chief architect of the Contract with America. 
 Joan Blondell, film and television actress, attended UNT (then North Texas State Teacher's College) in 1926–1927.
 Pat Boone, American pop singer, briefly attended UNT.
 Bowling for Soup, American rock band, based in Denton since 1996 and mentioned the county in their song Ohio (Come Back to Texas)
 Terry Bradshaw, former Pittsburgh Steelers quarterback
 Mason Cox, professional Australian rules footballer, playing for Collingwood in the AFL
 Phyllis George, 1971 Miss America, sportscaster and former First Lady of Kentucky
 Joe Greene, defensive tackle for the Pittsburgh Steelers, 1969–1981; 1969 defensive rookie of the year; 1972 and 1974 defensive player of the year; NFL 1970s all-decade team; Hall of Fame
 Jim Hightower, former Texas Agriculture Commissioner
 Norah Jones, UNT jazz major
 Henry Lee Lucas, serial killer, known as the "Confession Killer," committed a 1982 murder in Denton that ultimately led to his arrest
 Meat Loaf, American singer and actor, attended UNT

 Gordon McLendon, radio broadcaster and pioneer, B-movie producer, and conservative political financier
 Laina Morris - the Overly Attached Girlfriend
 Bill Moyers, White House press secretary in the Johnson Administration (1965–67), attended UNT 
 Anne Rice, author, attended TWU and UNT, married in Denton
 Sly Stone, the musician and frontman of Sly and the Family Stone
 Rex Tillerson, former CEO of ExxonMobil and 69th United States Secretary of State, resident of Bartonville
 Von Erich family, multigenerational professional wrestling family, known for a series of premature deaths sometimes referred to as the Von Erich curse
 Tex Watson, central member of the "Manson family" and leader of the Tate-LaBianca murders in August 1969.

See also

 Denton County Sheriff's Office (Texas)
 Denton County Times
 List of museums in North Texas
 National Register of Historic Places listings in Denton County, Texas
 Recorded Texas Historic Landmarks in Denton County

References

Further reading

 
 
 
 
 
  Alt URL
 
 
 
 
  Alt URL

External links

 Denton County government's website
 Headlines about Denton County from The Dallas Morning News
 Denton County entry in the Handbook of Texas Online at the University of Texas
 Denton County Texas Almanac Page
 Historic Denton County materials, hosted by the Portal to Texas History.
 Captain John B. Denton, preacher, lawyer and soldier. His life and times in Tennessee, Arkansas and Texas by Wm. Allen., published 1905, hosted by the Portal to Texas History

 
Dallas–Fort Worth metroplex counties
1846 establishments in Texas
Populated places established in 1846